Hierodula tonkinensis is a praying mantis species in the tribe Paramantini.

This species may be endemic to Vietnam.

References

External links 

tonkinensis
Mantodea of Asia
Insects of Vietnam